Mitchell Krueger was the defending champion and successfully defended his title.

Krueger won the title after defeating Bjorn Fratangelo 6–4, 6–3 in the final.

Seeds

Draw

Finals

Top half

Bottom half

References

External links
Main draw
Qualifying draw

Cary Challenger II - 1
2021 Singles 2